First Baptist Church is a historic Baptist church building at the junction of East Washington Avenue and Northeast Fifth Street in Anadarko, Oklahoma.

It was built in 1914 and was added to the National Register of Historic Places in 2007.

References

African-American history of Oklahoma
Baptist churches in Oklahoma
Churches on the National Register of Historic Places in Oklahoma
Churches completed in 1914
Buildings and structures in Caddo County, Oklahoma
National Register of Historic Places in Caddo County, Oklahoma